Stephanie Louise Gilmore (29 January 1988) is an Australian professional surfer and eight-time world champion on the Women's WSL World Tour (2007, 2008, 2009, 2010, 2012, 2014, 2018, 2022).

Career
Gilmore's life as a surfer began at age 9 when she stood on a bodyboard. By age 17 she was entering world tour events as a wild card competitor, which paid off with a victory at the 2005 Roxy Pro Gold Coast. In her next season she won another wild card event, the 2006 Havaianas Beachley Classic. Gilmore's success on the WQS (World Qualifying Series) tour qualified her for the 2007 Women's ASP World Tour and she did not disappoint. She won four of the eight events and claimed the 2007 World Title. She would repeat her success in 2008, 2009, 2010, 2012, 2014 and 2018.

Gilmore also won the inaugural Swatch Girls Pro France in 2010. Also in 2010, she was inducted into the Surfers' Hall of Fame and won the Laureus World Action Sportsperson of the year award.

Gilmore is currently the top athlete on the ROXY Surf Team. In 2014, Gilmore starred in a feature-length documentary titled Stephanie in the Water.

Gilmore qualified for the Tokyo 2020 Olympics. She had a bye in Round 2 but was then beaten by Bianca Buitendag from South Africa in Round 3 and did not contest for a medal. Australia at the 2020 Summer Olympics details the results in depth.

2007 World Title
Although the 2007 season was Gilmore's rookie year, she captured the Foster's ASP Women's World Title. She won three events in 2007 to enter the final event of the season, the Billabong Pro Maui, ranked in first place; when the other contenders - former world champion Sofia Mulanovich and sophomore Silvana Lima - bowed out before her, she won the title.

Victories

Source

WSL Women's Championship Tour

Life

In December 2010, she was attacked outside her home in New South Wales Australia, by a man with a metal bar. She ended up in the hospital with cuts to the head and a broken wrist.

References

External links

ROXY Team Rider Stephanie Gilmore
Steph Gilmore's 2007 World Champion website
Surf champ Stephanie Gilmore bashed at home

Living people
World Surf League surfers
1988 births
Australian female surfers
Sportswomen from New South Wales
People from Tweed Heads, New South Wales
Laureus World Sports Awards winners
Olympic surfers of Australia
Surfers at the 2020 Summer Olympics